The Assumption Cathedral is a Roman Catholic cathedral in Dubrovnik, Croatia. It is the seat of the Diocese of Dubrovnik.

History
The cathedral was built on the site of several former cathedrals, including 7th, 10th and 11th century buildings, and their 12th century successor in the Romanesque style. The money to build the basilica was partially contributed by the English king Richard the Lion Heart, as a votive for having survived a shipwreck near the island of Lokrum in 1192 on his return from the Third Crusade.

This building was largely destroyed in the earthquake of 1667. The Senate of Dubrovnik appealed to the Italian architect Andrea Bufalini of Urbino, who sent a model for the new church in Baroque style with a nave, two aisles and a cupola. Several other Italian architects including Francesco Cortese (present from 1669 until his death in 1670), Paolo Andreotti of Genoa (present 1671-1674), Pier Antonio Bazzi of Genoa (present 1677-78), and friar Tommaso Napoli of Palermo (present 1689 - 1700), all working with local and imported stonemasons, completed the Cathedral over the next three decades. Napoli made several crucial changes to the original plans including the use of a cross vault and the opening of large thermal windows at the upper level. This gives the whole interior a lighter and brighter feel. The style of the cathedral is in keeping with the esthetics of Roman Baroque architecture as practiced by Bernini, Carlo Fontana and their 17th century contemporaries. The construction began in 1673. The building was finished in 1713 by the Dubrovnik architect Ilija Katičić.

The building was damaged by the 1979 Montenegro earthquake, requiring several years of repairs.

The cathedral was damaged by at least one shell during the Siege of Dubrovnik in 1991. The damage has since been repaired.

Description
The portal of the facade is flanked by four Corinthian columns. On top of the central part is a large Baroque window with a triangular gable and a balustrade with statues of saints. The deep niches in the facade contains statues of Saint Blaise (patron saint of Dubrovnik) and Joseph with Child. The lateral sides of the cathedral are rather plain, articulated by pillars and semicircular windows. The side entrances are smaller than the frontal portal.

The building features a high nave, separated by massive columns from the two aisles, three apses and a grand Baroque dome at the intersection of the nave and the transepts. The main altar holds a polyptych by Titian, portraying a version of the Assumption of the Virgin. This painting probably dates from 1552; the side altars hold paintings of Italian and Dalmatian masters of later centuries.

Treasury
The Cathedral treasury (Riznica Katedrale) shows clearly the numerous connections Dubrovnik had with the main seaports in the Mediterranean Sea. The treasury holds 182 reliquaries holding relics from the 11th to 18th centuries; from local masters, Byzantium, Venice and the Orient. Its most important object is the gold-plated arm, leg and skull of Saint Blaise (patron saint of Dubrovnik). The head is in the shape of a crown of Byzantine emperors, adorned with precious stones and enameled medals. The treasury holds also a relic of the True Cross. Other outstanding examples in the treasury are a number of church vessels (13th to 18th century), many of them manufactured by local goldsmiths, and a number of valuables, such as the Romanesque-Byzantine icon of Madonna and Child (13th century) and paintings, among others, by Padovanini, Palma il Giovane, Savoldo, Parmigianino and P. Bordone.

Gallery

References

Sources
 Dubrovnik, history, culture, art heritage by Antun Travirka; Forum, Zadar, 2014; 
 The Cathedral Treasury
 

Buildings and structures in Dubrovnik
17th-century Roman Catholic church buildings in Croatia
Roman Catholic cathedrals in Croatia
Roman Catholic churches completed in 1713
1713 establishments in Europe
Cathedral